Electroconvulsive therapy (ECT) is a controversial therapy used to treat certain mental illnesses such as major depressive disorder, schizophrenia, depressed bipolar disorder, manic excitement, and catatonia. These disorders are difficult to live with and often very difficult to treat, leaving individuals suffering for long periods of time. In general, ECT is not looked at as a first line approach to treating a mental disorder, but rather a last resort treatment when medications such as antidepressants are not helpful in reducing the clinical manifestations.

"Electroconvulsive therapy entails deliberately inducing a modified generalized seizure under medically-controlled conditions to obtain a therapeutic effect." The therapeutic effect being reduced clinical manifestations of one's mental disorder, therefore leading to less suffering. “ECT has been shown through various research trials to cause significant physiological and chemical changes at a molecular level of the brain; however, it is thought that the sustainability of ECT is threatened due to associated stigma and poor impression of the treatment itself”.

History of ECT 

Before the 20th century, observations of the relationship between mental health and the physical body began to take place in the world of psychiatry. Between 1917 and 1934, there were developments in treating mental illnesses by physical means. Eventually by 1938, ECT was first used in Italy by neurologist Ugo Cerletti to treat schizophrenia. ECT's popularity grew after it was observed that it was safer and more effective than previous somatic treatments, and it was noted that people with depression benefited more from ECT than those with schizophrenia.

Controversy  
Until the end of the 1960s, the way in which ECT was performed could be considered, for lack of a better term, shocking. "In these early days clients might be ‘shocked’ in open, communal wards of psychiatric asylums, tied to beds, without anaesthetic or muscle-relaxing agents, often several times a week. As an unfortunate consequence, many of the patients who underwent ECT felt abused, oppressed, punished and damaged, all of which had a negative impact on the treatment itself and psychiatry as a whole".

"Aside from the therapy’s crude beginnings, controversy may have also been caused by a lack of information given when practitioners obtain informed consent before treatment, unknown mechanism of action, lack of knowledge about the cognitive adverse effects that can occur, divergent views of clinicians and consumers about ECT, and wide variations in official guidelines on minimal standards of ECT use".  

Essentially, the usage of ECT to treat mental disorder has been highly scrutinized by practitioners, and the general public as whole due to its controversial history in psychiatry, combined with its negative stigma in the modern world. This negative stigma in the modern world has created little importance in providing the adequate education for medical personnel at all levels, including medical student and board-certified psychiatrists. “It should be standard practice for all medical students to learn the basics of ECT and for all psychiatric residents to know enough about it to refer patients for whom ECT is an appropriate treatment consideration”. The effectiveness of ECT is high compared to antidepressants and other antidepressant treatments such as vagus nerve stimulation and transcranial magnetic stimulation; for this reason, clients, students, and medical professionals should be informed about the benefits and effectiveness that ECT can offer.

"Some of the professional and popular ambivalence toward ECT is related to the fact that we still do not know exactly how it works”. The lack of awareness on the effectiveness of ECT and the poor understanding of the exact functionality behind the treatment leads others to believe that ECT is unscientific. “The precise mechanism underlying the efficacy of ECT remains unclear, but one theory is that it promotes neuroplasticity by optimizing or “resetting” existing brain networks". ECT is thought to be morally wrong, just like other medical procedures that bring up controversy, such as abortion. However, “The best spokespeople for ECT are those patients and their family members who know from personal experience how debilitating depression can be and how effectively ECT can provide relief”.

"Although electroconvulsive therapy (ECT) is one of the most effective treatments for various psychiatric disorders since its introduction, it is one of the most controversial and scrutinized therapies in psychiatry". Because it is highly controversial and scrutinized there is lack of importance given to educating students about ECT. "The negative connotations related to ECT tend to get reinforced from lack of knowledge and negative attitudes". With the lack of knowledge students cannot provide client's all alternatives to their entitled care. Educating students is important because they can go through their career understanding the many alternatives and they can provide patients with a knowledgeable background to support it. "Nurses play an essential role in ECT, because of their close involvement with patients before and after the procedure. The knowledge and attitude of the nursing staff working ECT rooms can have direct impact on the quality of their nursing practice". In a study, published in the Journal of Neuroscience in Rural Practice, there was a total of 183 nursing students that were surveyed on their knowledge about electroconvulsive therapy. “Only about half (53.6%) of the participants were aware that ECT cannot be given against the wishes of the patients”. This result has a lot to do with the associated stigma, that patients receive ECT against their will, no treatment is given against the patients wishes. Changing this stigma can happen with knowledge that starts at school. "The present study shows that there are gaps in knowledge about ECT among nursing students… To fill such gaps there is a need to develop more pro-ECT curriculum".

How the procedure works

Candidates  
Electroconvulsive therapy is effectively used in major depressive patients to increase the amount of nerve cells in the hippocampus, a region of the brain that is involved in mood regulation and memory. Antidepressants drugs have a similar effect but to a lesser extent than ECT.

ECT is prescribed by a psychiatrist. Indications for ECT use were initially for schizophrenia, and those who poorly respond to medications. ECT can be used in the treatment for those with major depressive disorder, depressed bipolar disorder, manic bipolar disorder, schizophrenia, manic excitement and catatonia. "Decision to conduct ECT therapy usually comes after there has been failure in other forms of treatment, including medication and psychotherapy".

Prior to performing ECT, a set of tests are performed to ensure the patient fits the needs for ECT without further complication in their health status, that may prevent them from being eligible for treatment. Other medical screenings are performed to ensure that their depression is not caused by other medical illness because that can lead ECT to be ineffective. “Before starting electroconvulsive therapy, all patients are screened for medical illnesses, for two reasons. First, a variety of medical illnesses are associated with depression or mania. The second reason for screening the patient is to establish that it is safe to proceed with ECT”. Once the patient passed those two screening, the patient then is evaluated on their medical history, physical exam, psychiatric history, mental status exam, blood count, chemistries, urinalysis, and electrocardiogram. Contraindications and risk include cerebral aneurysms, heart attack, emphysema, multiple sclerosis, and muscular dystrophy.

Procedure 
Before performing ECT, clients are instructed to be nil by mouth for 8 hours before the procedure to prevent aspiration of food or liquid into the lungs that could increase the risk of pneumonia. The client also has a secured peripheral intravenous (IV) access, blood pressure cuff around one extremity, and is connected to an electrocardiogram (ECG), electroencephalogram (EEG) and pulse oximetry. The ECG and EEG are used to monitor electrical currents of the induced seizure. The nurse then ensures, “the patient is fully informed about their illness, why ECT has been recommended for them, the treatment process initially and throughout the course, allaying fears of the patient or their family may have about ECT and directing their attention to scientific fact and evidence supporting its use”

The client is then given a short-acting anesthetic, such as methohexital, and also given a muscle relaxant, such as succinylcholine.  Once the determination of muscle paralysis is determined, a mild electrical current is administered to the patient's brain. Paralysis is determined by observing the extremity that the blood pressure cuff is placed on. The blood pressure is inflated to stop the effects of the muscle relaxant to a specific part of the body, allowing muscle to contract from the electrical current that is administered to the patient's brain. It is important to see the physical signs along with activity on EEG to determine the effectiveness of the procedure. “Small amounts of physical movement may be seen in the face, feet, or hands. These movements are not nearly as severe as those that occurred before the advent of muscle relaxants”.

After receiving ECT, “nurses will ensure the patient’s airway is maintained, monitor observations and administer prescribed medications to counter adverse effects…”. After ensuring the patient is stable, the nurse would observe for normal side effects and document those side effects. “There is a period of confusion and disorientation that rapidly follows the treatment; it clears quickly. With each successive treatment, the patient is left with an ongoing loss of memory which will gradually clear after the course of therapy is finished”. “Patients usually receive 6 to 12 treatments for full therapeutic benefit, but the number of ECT applications is titrated individually for each case”. In many cases, the client receives ECT multiple times per week and a gradual decrease in treatments once the therapeutic effect is reached and noticed by client and physician.

Contraindications and side effects of ECT 

There are no absolute reasons not to perform electroconvulsive therapy. There are certain conditions, however, that produce a significant increase risk with ECT. The list of contraindications for receiving ECT is relatively short. Once the decision to undergo ECT is made collaboratively between the patient and physician, the patient is screened for any contraindications. These include a history of cerebral aneurysms, heart attack, emphysema, multiple sclerosis, and muscular dystrophy.

Side effects  
The client can exhibit side effects such as nausea, headache, muscle stiffness, transient confusion, and temporary memory loss. “The most disturbing and severe side effect of ECT is memory loss. It is believed that this side effect is attributable to the electricity that is passed through the brain”. “Most people return to reasonable function within the first month and to complete function after six months.” (Piotrowski and Guerra, 2013). These side effects are rare but commonly subside shortly after treatment. “For many people, the potential for adverse events outweigh the potential benefit of the treatment, even if the end result may be remission from depression”.

ECT compared to antidepressant medications 
Antidepressants are considered a first line treatment for depression. While these medications are assessable to most, and effective enough to reduce clinical manifestations and increase quality of life for many suffering from depression, they are often not effective for severe depression and they come with a large array of side effects. There are multiple types of antidepressant medications: selective serotonin reuptake inhibitors (SSRIs), noradrenaline uptake inhibitors (NRIs), monoamine oxidase inhibitors (MAOIs), as well as tricyclic and tetracyclic antidepressants, all of which have a different list of unpleasant side effects.

Side effects of MAOIs include tremors, insomnia, increased appetite leading to weight gain, blurred vision, urinary retention, headaches, acute hypertension and can even lead to intracranial hemorrhage when taken with food substances containing tyramine. As one could imagine, these side effects are not easy to live with, especially on top of the already crippling aspects of living with mental illnesses such as depression. “Side effects of SSRIs and NRIs include nausea, anorexia, insomnia, loss of libido, and when combined with MOAIs, tremors, cardiovascular collapse and hyperthermia.

Efficacy 
As previously stated, ECT is not considered a first-line treatment for depression, but rather an intervention used when other interventions such as antidepressant medications do not help relieve one's symptoms. According to Pakistan Armed Forces Medical Journal, a descriptive case study conducted from April 2017 to October 2017 gathered a sample of 47 patients age 18–65 of either gender with treatment resistant depression with or without psychotic features. Each patient was prescribed ECT for treatment resistant depression when there was no clinical improvement with two trials of anti- depressants from different pharmacological groups along with psychotherapy for at least 6–8 weeks or no clinical response to one or two courses of an antidepressant/antipsychotic combination in case of psychotic symptoms. Participants in this study underwent 6 sessions (3 weeks) of ECT and were then assessed for clinical symptom improvement.  “The study concluded that efficacy of electroconvulsive therapy in patients with treatment-resistant depression was overall high with no major difference found in efficacy with respect to variables like age, gender, and psychosis”.

Earning its place in the modern world 
With the addition of multiple antidepressants and antipsychotics to treat mental disorders, ECT is not widely implemented in the U.S. today, despite the research that suggests it is an effective treatment for severe depression and other mental illnesses. The negative stigma surrounding ECT, thanks to its crude beginnings in psychology along with its perhaps not so accurate portrayal in movies and television, is still alive and well. However, because the methods used to perform ECT have drastically changed since its earlier days, individuals may be more open to trying ECT to relieve their symptoms of severe mental illnesses that have not responded to first line treatment. The fears surrounding the procedure are somewhat justified considering the history, but research and new implementation of ECT by trained physicians has proven that this is a safe and effective treatment that has the potential to help many individuals. Further education in medical and nursing schools will help to further promote the implementation of ECT and help those suffering in the vicious cycle of trying to relieve the symptoms of their mental illness.

References 

Electroconvulsive therapy
History of medicine
History of psychology